Events in the year 1852 in Japan.

Incumbents
Monarch: Kōmei

Births
November 3- Mutsuhito, 122nd Emperor of Japan, child of Emperor Kōmei and Nakayama Yoshiko (d. 1912)

References

 
1850s in Japan
Japan
Years of the 19th century in Japan